V16 is the official name given in Spain to warner beacon light.  The driver can place it on the roof without getting out of the vehicle and immediately become visible in the event of an accident or breakdown.

The use of warner light beacons came into force on July 1, 2021, and both the warning triangle and conventional V16 lights can be used until January 2026. After that date, the only legal form of warning device that can be used in Spain is the V16 beacon light that has integrated geolocation and connected to the DGT 3.0 cloud.

Description 
The V16 are yellow flashing light devices that are placed on the top without getting out of the vehicle. The light covers a horizontal field of vision of 360 degrees, and at least ± 8 degrees up and down on the vertical field. The device's power supply is autonomous, unwired, with a button or battery to guarantee use after 18 months.

The V16 beacon must have an approval code that can be seen without difficulty and that does not deteriorate: LCOE XXXXXXXXXXXXXXXXG1 or IDIADA PC XXXXXXXXXXXX. In this code, instead of the letter x, the date of approval and the serial number must be included.

History 
The V16 beacon was created by Galician inventor Jorge Torre who, aware of the high accident rate on the road due to vehicle breakdowns or accidents, had been looking for a solution to reduce the number of deaths and injuries. In 2015, Torre created the first prototype and teamed up with Jorge Costas, also an entrepreneur, to launch the first brand of V16 devices: Help Flash.

In 2018, following the commercialization of the product, several Spanish administrations recognized the V16 lights, which were approved by the DGT as the most efficient for reducing the accident rate associated with vehicle stops on the road due to breakdown or accident; they were therefore included in the Reform of the Vehicle Regulations through Ministerial Order PCI/810/2018.

In March 2021, Royal Decree 159/2021 was approved for the replacement of the triangle by V16 type signs, which in 2026 will be directly connected to the DGT 3.0 cloud.

References

Related links 

 Royal Decree 159/2021, regulating roadside assistance services.
 Light V16 DGT: answers to the five questions we all ask ourselves.


Safety equipment
Vehicle law
Road safety